HadiShahr (also Romanized as Kaleh Bast) is a city capital of Rudbast District, on the Caspian Sea, in Mazandaran Province of northern Iran.

As of the 2006 census, its population was 3,543, with there being 965 families.

References

Cities in Mazandaran Province
Populated places in Babolsar County
Populated places on the Caspian Sea
Populated coastal places in Iran